Oh Jea-Han (born  in Namyangju) is a South Korean bobsledder.

Oh competed at the 2014 Winter Olympics for South Korea. He teamed with driver Kim Dong-Hyun, Kim Sik and Kim Kyung-Hyun in the South Korea-2 sled in the four-man event, finishing 28th.

Oh made his World Cup debut in December 2013. As of April 2014, his best World Cup finish is 25th, in 2013-14 at Lake Placid.

References

1991 births
Living people
Olympic bobsledders of South Korea
Bobsledders at the 2014 Winter Olympics
South Korean male bobsledders
People from Namyangju
Sportspeople from Gyeonggi Province